Andrew Marantz (born September 26, 1984) is an American author and journalist who writes for The New Yorker.

Marantz was an undergraduate at Brown University from 2002 to 2006 with a bachelor's degree in religion and religious studies. He was a graduate student at New York University from 2009 to 2011 with a master's degree in journalism. He is a staff writer for The New Yorker and has contributed to the magazine since 2011. He wrote the 2019 book Antisocial: Online Extremists, Techno-Utopians and the Hijacking of the American Conversation, The edition of the book published by London's Picador is entitled Antisocial: How Extremists Broke America. In 2020, Project Syndicate chose it as one of the best reads of 2020 finding it "...to be one of the best recent accounts of how social media has come to dominate political discourse in the United States."

Marantz married the lawyer Sarah Lustbader in October 2013. They have a son, Gideon Caleb Marantz (b. 2017). Andrew Marantz's father is the physician Paul R. Marantz.

Bibliography

Books

Essays and reporting

Critical studies and reviews of Marantz's work
Antisocial
 
 
———————
Notes

See also
 Mass media in the United States

References

External links
 
 
 

1984 births
Living people
Place of birth missing (living people)
Brown University alumni
New York University alumni
20th-century American Jews
American magazine journalists
The New Yorker people
21st-century American Jews